Stephen Douglas Wilson (born December 13, 1964) is a Canadian former professional baseball player. A left-handed pitcher, he played all or part of six seasons in Major League Baseball. He is an alumnus of the University of Portland and participated in the 1983 Pan American Games and the 1984 Summer Olympics for Canada.

In 1984, Steve pitched for the Alaska Goldpanners of Fairbanks summer amateur baseball club, where he was among 12 other players to eventually reach the major leagues.

Wilson was drafted by the Texas Rangers in 1985 in the 4th round, 83rd overall, and went on to make his Major League Baseball debut with the Texas Rangers on September 16, 1988.  On December 5, 1988, Wilson was traded from the Rangers to the Chicago Cubs with Paul Kilgus, Curtis Wilkerson, and Mitch Williams for Rafael Palmeiro, Jamie Moyer, and Drew Hall. After two and a half seasons in Chicago, he was then traded to the Los Angeles Dodgers for Jeff Hartsock. Wilson appeared in his final major league game on October 2, 1993.

Wilson pitched in the Milwaukee Brewers organization in 1994, and in the Chicago White Sox system in 1996. In 1997 and 1998 Wilson played for the Taiwan Major League (TML)'s Kaohsiung-Pingtung Fala.

Wilson retired after TML's 1998 season to get married and settle down in Tainan. He currently runs an English school for Elementary age children, and scouts for the Chicago Cubs in the Pacific Rim. Wilson also scouts in southern California for the Cubs.

References

External links

1964 births
Sportspeople from Victoria, British Columbia
Albuquerque Dukes players
Baseball people from British Columbia
Baseball players at the 1984 Summer Olympics
Olympic baseball players of Canada
Canadian expatriate baseball players in the United States
Chicago Cubs players
Texas Rangers players
Los Angeles Dodgers players
Burlington Rangers players
Tulsa Drillers players
Charlotte Rangers players
Iowa Cubs players
New Orleans Zephyrs players
Nashville Sounds players
Portland Pilots baseball players
Living people
Major League Baseball pitchers
Major League Baseball players from Canada
Baseball players at the 1983 Pan American Games
Pan American Games competitors for Canada
Alaska Goldpanners of Fairbanks players